This list is of the Cultural Properties of Japan designated in the category of  for the Prefecture of Akita.

National Cultural Properties
As of 1 July 2019, four  Important Cultural Properties have been designated, being of national significance.

Prefectural Cultural Properties
As of 24 May 2019, thirty properties have been designated at a prefectural level.

Municipal Cultural Properties
Properties designated at a municipal level include:

See also
 Cultural Properties of Japan
 List of National Treasures of Japan (paintings)
 Japanese painting
 List of Historic Sites of Japan (Akita)
 Akita Museum of Art

References

External links
  Cultural Properties in Akita Prefecture

Cultural Properties,Akita
Cultural Properties,Paintings
Paintings,Akita
Lists of paintings